Jaume Camps i Rovira (9 November 1944 – 2 December 2022) was a Spanish lawyer and politician. A member of the Democratic Convergence of Catalonia, he served in the Parliament of Catalonia from 1980 to 2005.

Camps died on 2 December 2022, at the age of 78.

References

1944 births
2022 deaths
Spanish lawyers
Convergence and Union politicians
Members of the Parliament of Catalonia
Politicians from Barcelona